The Morane-Saulnier MS.315 was a primary training monoplane designed and built in France by Morane-Saulnier.

Development
The MS.315 was developed from the earlier MS.300 primary trainer and related variants and first flew in October 1932. The MS.315 is a parasol-wing monoplane with a tailskid, with divided main landing gear, and powered by a 135 hp (101 kW) Salmson 9Nc radial engine. A production run of 346 aircraft followed the four prototypes (including 33 built after the Second World War). Five high-powered MS.317/2 variants were also produced for the civil market, and a single MS.316 was built, powered by a Régnier inverted Vee engine.

In the 1960s 40 MS.315 used as civil glider tugs were modified with a 220 hp (164 kW) Continental W670-K radial engine and re-designated the MS.317.

Variants
MS.315
Production version with a 135hp (101kW) Salmson 9Nc radial engine, 350 built.
MS.315/2
Higher powered civil version, five built.
MS.316
Variant powered by a Regnier inverted Vee engine, one built.
MS.317
1960s conversions with a 220hp (164kW) Continental W670-K radial engine, 40 converted.

Operators

French Air Force
French Navy

Peruvian Air Force

Specifications (MS.315)

See also

References

Further reading

 

1930s French military trainer aircraft
MS.315
Parasol-wing aircraft
Single-engined tractor aircraft
Aircraft first flown in 1932